Mount Matkin is a  Canadian mountain located on the border of Alberta and British Columbia on the Continental Divide. It was named after Sergeant Philip K Matkin of the Royal Canadian Air Force.

See also
 List of peaks on the Alberta–British Columbia border
 Mountains of Alberta
 Mountains of British Columbia

References

Matkin
Matkin
Canadian Rockies